Corralitos (Spanish for "Small pens") is a census-designated place (CDP) in Santa Cruz County, California, United States. It is a rural area known for its agriculture of apples and strawberries, and its notable Corralitos Market and Sausage Co. Moreover, its location near the Pacific Ocean optimizes viticulture.

The population was 2,326 at the 2010 census.

Geography
Corralitos is located at  (36.991303, -121.802013). It is located on Corralitos Creek, a tributary of Salsipuedes Creek which is in turn the lowest tributary of the Pajaro River.

Demographics

2010
The 2010 United States Census reported that Corralitos had a population of 2,326. The racial makeup of Corralitos was 1,980 (85.1%) White, 16 (0.7%) African American, 12 (0.5%) Native American, 48 (2.1%) Asian, 190 (8.2%) from other races, and 79 (3.4%) from two or more races. Hispanic or Latino of any race were 532 persons (22.9%).

The Census reported that 99.7% of the population lived in households and 0.3% lived in non-institutionalized group quarters.

There were 829 households, out of which 257 (31.0%) had children under the age of 18 living in them, 511 (61.6%) were opposite-sex married couples living together, 62 (7.5%) had a female householder with no husband present, 42 (5.1%) had a male householder with no wife present.  There were 51 (6.2%) unmarried opposite-sex partnerships, and 3 (0.4%) same-sex married couples or partnerships. 150 households (18.1%) were made up of individuals, and 65 (7.8%) had someone living alone who was 65 years of age or older. The average household size was 2.80.  There were 615 families (74.2% of all households); the average family size was 3.09.

The population was spread out, with 504 people (21.7%) under the age of 18, 174 people (7.5%) aged 18 to 24, 482 people (20.7%) aged 25 to 44, 829 people (35.6%) aged 45 to 64, and 337 people (14.5%) who were 65 years of age or older.  The median age was 45.1 years. For every 100 females, there were 98.5 males.  For every 100 females age 18 and over, there were 98.3 males.

The homeowner vacancy rate was 0.8%; the rental vacancy rate was 2.3%. 74.5% of the population lived in owner-occupied housing units and 25.2% lived in rental housing units.

2000
As of the census of 2000, there were 2,431 people, 815 households, and 621 families residing in the CDP. The racial makeup of the CDP was 81.61% White, 0.16% African American, 0.95% Native American, 2.30% Asian, 0.04% Pacific Islander, 10.98% from other races, and 3.95% from two or more races. Hispanic or Latino of any race were 19.13% of the population.

There were 815 households, out of which 36.3% had children under the age of 18 living with them, 65.0% were married couples living together, 8.6% had a female householder with no husband present, and 23.7% were non-families. 16.1% of all households were made up of individuals, and 4.8% had someone living alone who was 65 years of age or older.  The average household size was 2.86 and the average family size was 3.22.

In the CDP, the population was spread out, with 25.5% under the age of 18, 5.8% from 18 to 24, 27.0% from 25 to 44, 27.1% from 45 to 64, and 14.5% who were 65 years of age or older.  The median age was 40 years. For every 100 females, there were 96.8 males.  For every 100 females age 18 and over, there were 90.5 males.

The median income for a household in the CDP was $70,781, and the median income for a family was $80,626. Males had a median income of $44,750 versus $31,500 for females. The per capita income for the CDP was $27,572.  About 1.0% of families and 2.8% of the population were below the poverty line, including 0.8% of those under age 18 and none of those age 65 or over.

Government

References

External links
 History of Corralitos

Census-designated places in Santa Cruz County, California
Census-designated places in California